The German Armistice Commission (WAKO) was a military body charged with supervising the implementation of the  Franco-German Armistice, signed on 22 June 1940, in German-occupied France during World War II. The armistice came into effect at the same time as the Franco-Italian Armistice on 25 June monitored by a comparable Italian Armistice Commission. The commission's seat was at Wiesbaden in Germany, in the building that is now the Hessian State Chancellery.

The German Armistice Commission was created under Article 22 of the Armistice which stated that the "Armistice Commission, acting in accordance with the direction of the German High Command, will regulate and supervise the carrying out of the armistice agreement. It is the task of the Armistice Commission further to insure the necessary conformity of this agreement with the Italian-French armistice." In addition, the "French Government will send a delegation to the seat of the German Armistice Commission to represent the French wishes and to receive regulations from the German Armistice Commission for executing [the agreement]."

See also
 Vichy France
 Case Anton

Notes

References
 United States Department of State, Publication No. 6312, Documents on German Foreign Policy 1918-1945, Series D, IX, 671-676. Washington, DC: Government Printing Office, 1956.

Vichy France
French collaboration during World War II
Military history of France during World War II
Military history of Germany during World War II
1940 establishments in Europe
1942 disestablishments in Europe
Organizations established in 1940
Organizations disestablished in 1942
Government agencies established in 1940
Government agencies disestablished in 1942
1940 establishments in France
1942 disestablishments in France
1940 establishments in Germany
1942 disestablishments in Germany